Blue Job Mountain (pronounced  ) is a mountain in Farmington, New Hampshire. It has a fire tower at the summit, and numerous trails, most commonly accessed from First Crown Point Road in neighboring Strafford, crisscross the mountain.

Blue Job Mountain State Forest occupies  around the summit.

References

External links 
 

Mountains of New Hampshire
Mountains of Strafford County, New Hampshire
New Hampshire state forests
Protected areas of Strafford County, New Hampshire
State forests of the Appalachians
Farmington, New Hampshire